"Kangding Qingge", or "Kangding Love Song", is a traditional folk song of Kangding, Sichuan Province. The song is one of the most popular songs across the Sinosphere.

History

In 1946, while studying vocal music in Sikang Province, the Quanzhou native Wu Wen-ji had collected the song Paoma Liuliude Shanshang (On the Running Horse Mountain) amongst other local folk songs. While teaching at a Kuomintang military academy, Wu scored and renamed the song as Kangding Love Song, after the capital of the Sikang Province. The song was then spread to the rest of China after being performed by then popular Soprano Yu Yixuan.

The song has been performed or covered by many famous artists around the world, including Placido Domingo, Timi Zhuo, and A-mei.

Lyrics

In popular culture
The song was featured in an episode of the T.V. series Daredevil Season 01 Episode 05 titled "World On Fire".
The song "Runaway Train", from the soundtrack of the 2003 video game, Command and Conquer: Generals, samples this song.
This song is also sampled in a soundtrack of Dynasty Warriors 4, a video game by Koei.
The song "Fuji I (Global Dub)", from the album Akron/Family II: The Cosmic Birth and Journey of Shinju TNT by Akron/Family features a re-imagined version of this song.
The song also appears, mixed, in a video of Mandarin Oriental Luxury Hotel Hong Kong
The song "The Smooth Love Song" (溜溜的情歌), from the album Hui Wei (回蔚) by Karen Mok, samples this song.
The song "Kangding Love Song and Liuliu Tune" remix by Tan weiwei on I Am A Singer season 3, Ep9 in 2015.
Sammo Hung sings a portion of the song in the movie Dragons Forever.

References

Kangding
Year of song unknown
Chinese folk songs